The Percy-Lobdell Building is a historic warehouse located at 314 St. Mary Street in Thibodaux, Louisiana.

Built in c.1900, the structure is a two-story brick Italianate style warehouse with a monumental false front five bays wide. The building is home to the Wetlands Acadian Cultural Center of Jean Lafitte National Historic Park, and also hosts the Martha Sowell Utley Memorial Branch of the Lafourche Parish Library.

The building was listed on the National Register of Historic Places on March 5, 1986.

It is one of 14 individually NRHP-listed properties in the "Thibodaux Multiple Resource Area", which also includes:
Bank of Lafourche Building
Breaux House
Building at 108 Green Street
Chanticleer Gift Shop
Citizens Bank of Lafourche
Grand Theatre
Lamartina Building
McCulla House
Peltier House

Riviere Building
Riviere House
Robichaux House
St. Joseph Co-Cathedral and Rectory

See also
 National Register of Historic Places listings in Lafourche Parish, Louisiana

References

External links
Wetlands Acadian Cultural Center
Lafourche Parish Library HQ

Buildings and structures on the National Register of Historic Places in Louisiana
Buildings and structures completed in 1900
Italianate architecture in Louisiana
Lafourche Parish, Louisiana
National Register of Historic Places in Lafourche Parish, Louisiana